Bulgaria–Portugal relations are foreign relations between Bulgaria and Portugal. Diplomatic relations between both countries were established in 1925.  They were severed in 1945 and were restored on 24 June 1974. Bulgaria has an embassy and an honorary consulate in Lisbon. Portugal has an embassy in Sofia. Both countries are full members of the European Union and NATO.
Portugal has given full support to Bulgaria's membership in the European Union and NATO.

State visits
In 2003, Bulgarian Prime Minister Simeon Saxe-Coburg-Gotha visited Portugal and said "It would be useful to tap Portugal's experience in economic development after its European Union accession".

In December 2004, Bulgarian President Georgi Parvanov visited Portugal.

Agreements
In 2007, the two countries signed a police cooperation agreement.

Diplomacy

Republic of Bulgaria
Lisbon (Embassy)

Republic of Portugal
Sofia (Embassy)

See also 
 Foreign relations of Bulgaria
 Foreign relations of Portugal
 Bulgarians in Portugal
 Portugueses in Bulgaria
 Accession of Bulgaria to the European Union

References

External links 
  Bulgarian embassy in Lisbon
  Bulgarian Ministry of Foreign Affairs: direction of the Portuguese embassy in Sofia

 

 
Portugal 
Bilateral relations of Portugal